Africa Coast to Europe (ACE) is an optical-fiber submarine cable system serving 24 countries on the Europe , west coast and south Africa, managed by a consortium of 20 members.      

The ACE cable connects more than 450 million people, either directly for coastal countries or through land links for landlocked countries such as Mali and Niger. ACE is also the first international submarine cable to land in Equatorial Guinea, Gambia, Guinea, Liberia, Mauritania, São Tomé and Príncipe and Sierra Leone.          

Agreements are being put in place to allow the arrival of other operators in countries along the ACE cable route.                                    Guinea-Bissau is the next country to be connected to the submarine cable.                  

ACE Consortium consists of telecommunications operators and member countries that have invested in the total 700 million dollars project, sometimes with the financial support of the World Bank. The consortium agreement was signed on 5 June 2010 and on 15 December 2012, this 17,000 km-long cable was put into service for the first time. The official inauguration ceremony was held in Banjul, Gambia, on 19 December 2012.      

The 4 to 5 cms diameter cable runs at around 6,000m below the sea level. The maximum capacity of the entire system is increased from 12.8 Tbps in the design to 20 Tbps.       

It has been manufactured by Alcatel Submarine Networks (ASN) and laid by ships from ASN and Orange Marine.

ACE consortium

The cable cost consortium members $700 million: 

 ACE Gabon
Bénin ACE GIE
 Cable Consortium of Liberia
 Canalink
 Dolphin Telecom
 Gambia Submarine Cable
 GUILAB SA
 International Mauritania Telecom
 MTN Global Connect
 Orange (France)
 Orange Cameroun
 Orange Côte d'Ivoire
 Orange Mali
Orange Niger
Gestor de Infraestructuras de Telecomunicaciones de Guinea Ecuatorial
SCGB
 Sonatel
 STP Cabo

Landing points

Segment 1

 France, Penmarch
 Portugal, Carcavelos
 Espagne, île de Tenerife
 Mauritania, Nouakchott
 Senegal, Dakar

Segment 2

 Senegal, Dakar
 Gambia, Banjul
 Guinea-Bissau, Suro (coming up)
 Guinea, Conakry
 Sierra Leone, Freetown
 Liberia, Monrovia
 Ivory Coast, Abidjan

Segment 3

 Ivory Coast, Abidjan
 Ghana, Accra
 Benin, Cotonou
 Nigeria, Lagos
 Cameroon, Kribi
 Equatorial Guinea, Bata
 Gabon, Libreville
 Sao Tomé et principe, São Tomé

Segment 4 (The last segment is in service - 1 June 2021) 

 South Africa

Technical features 
This 17 000-kilometers long cable is the only one connecting 24 west African and European countries. The ACE consortium members are organized according to a global access concept: multiple investors in one landing station. ACE marine routes have a low history of fault and a time-proof technology. The cable is able to adopt newer transponder technology. 

Technical features are as below : 

 PoP-to-PoP connection providing access to major cities in Europe and Africa (Paris, Lisbon, Cape Town)
 100G technology proof
 Design capacity increased = 20 terabytes per second
 Lit capacity = 1.6 terabytes per second
 Initial capacity 200 Gbit/s on segment 1, 160 Gbit/s on segments 2 and 3
 Longest DLS = 4400 kilometres (Penmarch - Dakar)
 Low latency (express and omnibus fibres)
 Uses wavelength division multiplexing (the most advanced for submarine cables)

Cable systems
Individual cable systems off the west coast of Africa include:

 ATLANTIS-2
 GLO-1
 Main One
 SAT-2
 SAT-3/WASC
 WACS

See also 
 List of international submarine communications cables

References

External links
ACE-Africa Coast to Europe website

Submarine communications cables in the North Atlantic Ocean
Submarine communications cables in the South Atlantic Ocean
2012 establishments in Africa
2012 establishments in France
2012 establishments in Portugal